The 1891 Lafayette football team was an American football team that represented Lafayette College as an independent during the 1891 college football season. In its first year under head coach Wallace Moyle, the team compiled a 2–9–1 record and was outscored by a total of 161 to 86. Moncure March was the team captain. The team played its home games on The Quad in Easton, Pennsylvania.

Schedule

References

Lafayette
Lafayette Leopards football seasons
Lafayette football